La Carrera Airport  is an airport serving the city of Jiquilisco in Usulután Department, El Salvador.

See also

 Transport in El Salvador
 List of airports in El Salvador

References

External links
 HERE/Nokia - La Carrera
 FallingRain - La Carrera

Airports in El Salvador